Elizabeth Tate was a civil rights activist.

Elizabeth Tate may also refer to:

Elizabeth Tate (The Other Sister)
Elizabeth Tate High School, see List of high schools in Iowa 
Elizabeth Tate, character, see List of Quantum Leap episodes
Lizzie Tate or USS Victory (1863)

See also
Betty Tate (disambiguation)
Elizabeth Tait (disambiguation)